The 1982 LPGA Championship was the 28th LPGA Championship, played June 10–13 at Jack Nicklaus Golf Center at Kings Island in Mason, Ohio, a suburb northeast of Cincinnati.

Jan Stephenson led wire-to-wire to win the second of her three major titles, two strokes ahead of JoAnne Carner. She entered the final round with a two-stroke lead over Beth Daniel.

Past champions in the field

Made the cut

Source:

Missed the cut

Source:

Final leaderboard
Sunday, June 13, 1982

Source:

References

External links
Golf Observer leaderboard
The Golf Center at Kings Island

Women's PGA Championship
Golf in Ohio
LPGA Championship
LPGA Championship
LPGA Championship
LPGA Championship
Women's sports in Ohio